The 1980 NCAA Division III Lacrosse Championship was the inaugural single-elimination tournament to determine the national champions of NCAA Division III men's college lacrosse in the United States.

This was the first championship exclusively for Division III men's lacrosse programs, who previously competed in a combined-format Division II championship from 1974 to 1979.

The tournament field included eight times, with the final played at Boswell Field at the Hobart and William Smith Colleges in Geneva, New York. 

Hosts Hobart defeated Cortland in the final, 11–8, to win their first Division III national title. The Statesmen (12–2) were coached by Dave Urick. Hobart had previously won two national titles at the Division II level (1976 and 1977).

Bracket

See also
1980 NCAA Division I Men's Lacrosse Championship
1980 NCAA Division II Lacrosse Championship

References

NCAA Division III Men's Lacrosse Championship
NCAA Division III Men's Lacrosse Championship
NCAA Division III Men's Lacrosse